

William Ashby (12 January 1786 – 10 April 1847) was an English cricketer who played mainly for Kent teams. He was considered one of the best slow bowlers of his era and one of the pioneers of roundarm bowling.
 
Ashby was born in 1786 at Linton, Kent, the son of Thomas and Frances Ashby. He was a carpenter by trade who worked on the Sutton Valence estate of John Willes, a Kent landowner and cricketer and an influential proponent of the roundarm method of bowling in the early 19th century. Ashby already had a reputation as a fine cricketer and is first known to have played for the county side in 1807 alongside Willes, developing a reputation as the best slow bowler in Kent. Scores and Biographies described Ashby's bowling action as "not very high in delivery" and with what it described as an "unusual bias", although William Denison writing in 1846 in his Sketches of the Players, records that his bowling action later saw his arm raised above his elbow.

Later in 1807 Ashby made his first-class cricket debut, playing for an England side. He went on to make 45 appearances in top-class matches, most of them for Kent or England XIs. He also appeared for Hampshire, Sussex and Surrey sides as well as for MCC teams and played nine times for the Players against the Gentlemen. He played in the 1822 Kent match against MCC at Lord's when Lord Frederick Beauclerk, a leading MCC member, contrived to have Willes no-balled for throwing in an attempt to have roundarm bowling outlawed. Willes famously left the match although Ashby, whose bowling action was probably lower than Willes', continued to play. He also played in one of the roundarm trial matches of 1827 and was one of the signatories of the petition against the way that the Sussex bowlers in the matches had bowled.

Ashby played his last first-class match in 1830, but continued to play club cricket. He was employed as a professional at the Clarence Cricket Club in Camberwell in 1836 and played there for 10 years.

Ashby married Sarah Whatson in 1819 and had two children, a son and a daughter. He died of bronchitis at Lambeth in 1847 aged 61.

Notes

References

Bibliography
Birley D (1999) A Social History of English Cricket. London: Aurum Press. 
Carlaw D (2020) Kent County Cricketers A to Z. Part One: 1806–1914 (revised edition). (Available online at The Association of Cricket Statisticians and Historians. Retrieved 2020-12-21.)
Denison W (1846) Sketches of the Players. London: Simpkin, Marshall & Co. (Available online at Google Books. Retrieved 2022-04-08.)
Moore D (1988) The History of Kent County Cricket Club. London: Christopher Helm. 
Rendell B, Booth K (2010) Fuller Pilch: A Straightforward Man. Nottingham: The Association of Cricket Statisticians and Historians.

External links

1786 births
1847 deaths
English cricketers
English cricketers of 1787 to 1825
English cricketers of 1826 to 1863
Kent cricketers
Hampshire cricketers
Sussex cricketers
Players cricketers
People from Linton, Kent
Marylebone Cricket Club First 9 with 3 Others cricketers
Marylebone Cricket Club First 8 with 3 Others cricketers